Hyalobathra crenulata is a moth in the family Crambidae. It was described by Hari Sutrisno and Marianne Horak in 2003. It is found in Australia, where it has been recorded from Queensland.

The wings are grey with darker zigzag lines and dark margins.

References

Moths described in 2003
Pyraustinae
Moths of Australia
Taxa named by Marianne Horak